Cirsonella gaudryi is a species of sea snail, a marine gastropod mollusk in the family Skeneidae.

Description
The height of the shell attains 2.5 mm. The rather solid, shining, white shell has a turbinate shape. it has a narrow umbilicus. The spire consists of 3½ convex whorls, separated by a marked suture. The surface is smooth, except for the base which contains two or three very faint concentric striae. The circular aperture has a continuous peristome. The columella has a thick callus that connects to the convexity of the penultimate whorl. it covers for the greater part the umbilicus, that is reduced to a narrow, arched chink. The lip is simple.

Distribution
This species occurs in the Atlantic Ocean off the Azores and the Rockall Bank, in the Northeast Atlantic

References

External links
 

gaudryi
Gastropods described in 1896